Suba District was an administrative district in the former Nyanza Province of Kenya. Its capital town was Mbita Point. The district had a population of 155,666 and an area of 1,055 km² . Suba district was named after the Suba people, who inhabit local Rusinga and Mfangano Islands.

The district had two constituencies: Mbita Constituency and Gwassi . 

In line with the new Kenyan constitution of 2010, Suba district is now part of Homa Bay County.

External links 
Map of Migori and Suba districts

 
Former districts of Kenya